The following is a list of awards and nominations received by American actor, director and producer Nicolas Cage.

Cage started his career in films such as Fast Times at Ridgemont High (1982), and Valley Girl (1983) as well various films of his uncle Francis Ford Coppola such as Rumble Fish (1983), The Cotton Club (1984), and Peggy Sue Got Married (1986). In 1987, Cage earned critical success with films such as the Coen brothers' Raising Arizona (1987) and John Patrick Shanley's Moonstruck (1987). He would star in David Lynch's Wild at Heart (1990) and the romantic comedy It Could Happen to You (1994) before earning an Academy Award for Best Actor for his performance in Leaving Las Vegas (1995).

Following his awards win he starred in the blockbusters The Rock (1996), and Con Air (1997) as well as the drama Face/Off (1997) and the romantic drama City of Angels (1998). He starred in Martin Scorsese's drama Bringing Out the Dead and Charlie Kauffman's Adaptation, the latter earning him his second Academy Award nomination. He has since explored a variety genres including the National Treasure films in 2004, 2007 and the Ghost Rider films in 2007 and 2011. In the 21st century he has earned renewed critical acclaim for his performances in independent dramas such as Joe (2013), Mandy (2018), Color Out of Space (2019), and Pig (2021), the latter earning him a Critics' Choice Movie Award for Best Actor nomination.

Major associations

Academy Awards

British Academy Film Awards

Critics' Choice Movie Awards

Golden Globe Awards

Independent Spirit Awards

Screen Actors Guild Awards

Critics awards

Boston Society of Film Critics

Chicago Film Critics Association

Dallas–Fort Worth Film Critics Association

London Film Critics' Circle

Los Angeles Film Critics Association

National Board of Review

National Society of Film Critics

New York Film Critics Circle

Online Film Critics Society

St. Louis Gateway Film Critics Association

Toronto Film Critics Association

Vancouver Film Critics Circle

Women Film Critics Circle

Film festivals

Catalina Film Festival

Chicago International Film Festival

Deauville American Film Festival

Giffoni Film Festival

Ischia Film Festival

Palm Springs International Film Festival

San Francisco International Film Festival

San Sebastián International Film Festival

Transilvania International Film Festival

Toronto Film Festival

Miscellaneous awards

American Comedy Awards

Annie Awards

ALOS Awards

Blockbuster Entertainment Awards

Gold Derby Awards

Goldene Kamera Awards

Golden Raspberry Awards

Golden Schmoes Awards

Jupiter Award

MTV Movie and TV Awards

People's Choice Awards

Political Film Society Award

Sant Jordi Awards

Satellite Awards

Scream Awards

Stinkers Bad Movie Awards

Teen Choice Awards

Visual Effects Society

References

External links
 

Cage, Nicolas